Gabrče is a village southwest of Senožeče in the Municipality of Divača in the Littoral region of Slovenia.

Church

The local church is dedicated to Saint Anthony of Padua and belongs to the Parish of Senožeče.

References

External links 

Gabrče on Geopedia

Populated places in the Municipality of Divača